The following lists events that happened during 1932 in Afghanistan.

Kabul University is established. Initially, only a faculty of medicine exists.

Incumbents
 Monarch – Mohammed Nadir Shah
 Prime Minister – Mohammad Hashim Khan

February 1932
Towards the end of the month the new Fundamental Rules of the Afghan government are promulgated in an issue of the Islah of Kabul. These declare Afghanistan to be completely independent both in external and internal affairs, with Kabul for its capital. Islam is to be the religion of the country, and the Sharia (Islamic law) is to be binding. Afghan subjects are to enjoy liberty of the person and freedom in all matters of trade, industry, and agriculture, and slavery and forced labour are prohibited. There is to be a Council of State (Majlis-i-Shora-Milli) of 120 elected representatives from the provinces, to which proposals for new laws are to be submitted, and a 40-member Chamber of Notables (Majlis-i-Ayan) selected and appointed by the king. Primary education is made compulsory, and foreign newspapers which do not offend against the religion and policy of the state will be free to enter Afghanistan.

End of September 1932
Sardar Ala Gholam Nabi Khan, son of Abdor Rahman's famous general, Haidar Khan Charkhi, who was himself for many years Afghan minister at Moscow under King Amanullah, and made an abortive attempt to restore that monarch in May 1929, with Russian assistance, returns to Kabul from Berlin, where he had been living since the accession of Nadir Khan. Early in November he is arrested on a charge of fomenting rebellion among the tribes of the southeast among whom his family has great influence, and of intriguing with the Soviet government, with a view to procuring the restoration of King Amanullah. He is brought to trial before the Loya jirga, or Great Assembly, early in November, and, incriminating documents being produced, he is condemned to death and shot. One of his brothers, Gholam Jilani Khan, who recently returned from Moscow, is also arrested, and another, Gholam Zaddiq Khan, who was minister in Berlin, is dismissed from his post. The king's brother, Sardar Shah Mahmud, takes energetic steps to combat disaffection in the south, where one or two pretenders have appeared.

 
Afghanistan
Years of the 20th century in Afghanistan
Afghanistan
1930s in Afghanistan